Shearith Israel or Sherith Israel (Hebrew: שארית ישראל "Remnant of Israel"), may refer to the following Jewish synagogues:

Canada
Spanish and Portuguese Synagogue of Montreal, a Sephardic-Orthodox synagogue, also known as Shearith Israel

United States
Congregation Shearith Israel, a Sephardic-Orthodox synagogue, often called The Spanish and Portuguese Synagogue, in New York City.
Congregation Shearith Israel (Baltimore, Maryland), a historic (1851) congregation in Baltimore founded by Abraham Rice, the first ordained rabbi in the United States. 
Congregation Shearith Israel (Wharton, Texas), a defunct synagogue
Congregation Sherith Israel (Nashville, Tennessee), an Orthodox synagogue
Congregation Sherith Israel (San Francisco, California), a Reform synagogue
Sherith Israel Temple (Cincinnati, Ohio), an historic building previously used as a synagogue